2010–11 Albanian Cup was the fifty-ninth season of Albania's annual cup competition. It began on 21 September 2010 with the First Preliminary Round. The winners of the competition qualified for the second qualifying round of the UEFA Europa League. Besa were the defending champions, having won their second Albanian Cup last season. The cup was won by KF Tirana.

The rounds were played in a two-legged format similar to those of European competitions. If the aggregated score was tied after both games, the team with the higher number of away goals advanced. If the number of away goals was equal in both games, the match was decided by extra time and a penalty shootout, if necessary.

Preliminary Tournament
In order to reduce the number of participating teams for the First Round to 32, a preliminary tournament was played. Only teams from the Kategoria e Dytë (third level) were allowed to enter. Each Kategoria e Dytë group played its own tournament. In contrast to the main tournament, the preliminary tournament was held as a single-leg knock-out competition.

First Preliminary Round
Games were played on 21 September 2010.

|}

Second Preliminary Round
Games were played on 28 September 2010.

|}

First round
All twenty-eight teams of the 2010–11 Superiore and Kategoria e Parë entered in this round, along with the four Second Preliminary Round winners. First legs were played on 19 October 2010 and the second legs were played on 2 November 2010.

|}

Second round
In this round entered the 16 winners from the previous round.

|}

Quarter-finals
In this round entered the 8 winners from the previous round.

|}

Semi-finals
In this round entered the four winners from the previous round.

|}

Final

References

External links
 Official website 
 Albanian Cup at soccerway.com

Cup
2010–11 domestic association football cups
2010-11